Song Hong is the Vietnamese name of the Red River, known in Chinese as the "Hong He".

Song Hong may also refer to:

 Song Hong (Chinese: ), style name Zhongzi, a Chinese official during the Eastern Han dynasty
 Song Hong, Uttaradit